Siv Friðleifsdóttir (born 10 August 1962) (transliterated Siv Fridleifsdottir) is an Icelandic politician. Rarely used full name is Björg Siv Juhlin Friðleifsdóttir.
She is half-Norwegian and she partly grew up in Norway, where she spent almost every summer next to the Oslofjord with her grandparents.
She was a member of the Althing (Iceland's parliament) for the Progressive Party for the Reykjanes constituency from 1995 to 2003 and represented the Southwest Iceland constituency from 2003 to 2013. She has been Chairman of the Progressive Party parliamentary group since 2007, and was Minister of Health and Social Security from 2006 to 2007, Minister for the Environment and Minister for Nordic Cooperation from 1999 to 2004.

One of her notable policies was to make it illegal for strip clubs (and strippers) to operate in Iceland. This was made possible by parliament trying to develop feminist policies. Iceland's sex industry has been shut down by feminist politicians on 30 July 2010. Under Siv's law, Iceland has become the first European country to ban strip clubs.

References

1962 births
Living people
Siv Fridleifsdottir
Siv Fridleifsdottir
Siv Fridleifsdottir
Siv Fridleifsdottir
Siv Fridleifsdottir
Siv Fridleifsdottir
Siv Fridleifsdottir